Rutas de América is a stage road bicycle race held annually in February in Uruguay since 1972. From 2009 to 2012, the race was organized as a 2.2 event on the UCI America Tour.

Winners

References

External links
Official Website 

Cycle races in Uruguay
UCI America Tour races
Recurring sporting events established in 1972
1972 establishments in Uruguay